Agrypnus murinus is a species of click beetle belonging to the family Elateridae subfamily Agrypninae.

 This beetle is present in most of Europe, the eastern Palearctic realm, the Near East and the Nearctic realm.

The dark-brown larvae of this beetle develop in the soil, eating roots, worms and larvae of other insects.

The whole body is grey-brown with greyish points and is covered with a thick pubescence, while legs and antennae are mainly reddish or dark-brown.

References

 Mendel, H & Clarke, R.E, 1996, Provisional Atlas of the click beetles of (Coleoptera: Elateroidea) of Britain and Ireland, Ipswich Borough Council Museums, Ipswich
 Speight, M.C.D., 1989, The Irish Elaterid and Buprestid fauna (Coleoptera: Elateridae and Buprestidae), Bulletin Irish biogeographical Society, 12: 31-62
 Atlas of beetles of Russia
 Elateridae of British Isles

External links
 Elateridae
 Biolib
 Fauna Europaea
 Habitas

Elateridae
Beetles of Europe
Beetles described in 1758
Articles containing video clips
Taxa named by Carl Linnaeus